Phloen Chit Road (also spelled Ploenchit) is a major road in central Bangkok. It serves the neighbourhoods of Ratchaprasong, Chit Lom Intersection (where it intersects Chit Lom and Lang Suan Roads) and Phloen Chit Intersection (where it intersects Witthayu Road), which are home to major shopping malls, hotels and office towers. The areas are served by the Chit Lom and Phloen Chit Stations of the BTS skytrain, whose Sukhumvit Line runs above Phloen Chit Road.

History
Phloen Chit Road was built in 1920, in the reign of King Vajiravudh (Rama VI). Much of the area was then developed by the enterprising Chinese businessman Nai Lert, who bought large amounts of land, building for himself an estate (now Nai Lert Park) and subdivided the rest into plots to sell. The British Embassy, established on the corner of Phloen Chit Intersection in 1922, used to occupy one of the largest compounds in the area.

Its name "Phloen Chit" means "enjoy the mind" from the proposal of Prince Narathip Praphanphong. Because in those days, the location of this road can be considered a suburb and far away from the downtown. Therefore had to travel with inconvenience, so people are often referred to by the irony that "don't worry".

References

Streets in Bangkok
Pathum Wan district